Rhoemetalces II was a Client Ruler in association with his mother Antonia Tryphaena of the Sapaean kingdom of Thrace under the Romans. He ruled from 19 until 38 AD. On coinage his royal title is in Greek: ΒΑΣΙΛΕΩΣ ΡΟΙΜΗΤΑΛΚΟΥ or of King Rhoemetalces. Rhoemetalces II and Tryphaena succeeded his paternal great-uncle Rhescuporis II, who had usurped the throne from Rhoemetalces II's father Cotys VIII. The Roman Emperor Tiberius deposed Rhescuporis II and installed Rhoemetalces II and Tryphaena on the throne in his place. They served as loyal client rulers, even in 26 putting down Thracian malcontents for Tiberius. Rhoemetalces II never married and had no children. After his death in 38, his father's cousin Rhoemetalces III, the son of Rhescuporis II, was appointed king, while his mother retired to live as a private citizen in Cyzicus.

References

External links
 Coinage of Rhoemetalces II

38 deaths
Roman client rulers
1st-century monarchs in Europe
Year of birth unknown
Odrysian kings